Robin Monotti Graziadei is an Italian architect and film producer based in London. He is the managing partner of Robin Monotti Architects, a firm that he founded in 2007. In 2010, Monotti won the RIBA and Royal Parks Foundation's International Drinking Fountain Design Competition with his Watering Holes fountain design. In 2016 Robin co-founded the film production company Luminous Arts Productions.

Early life 
Monotti Graziadei was born and raised in Rome. He moved to England when he was 17 and studied BSc Architecture at the University of Bath in 1994. In 2000, he studied MA in Histories and Theories of Architecture at the Architectural Association of London.

Career 
From 2001 to 2007, he taught a Diploma Unit at the London Metropolitan University. He started Robin Monotti Architects in London in 2007 before which he worked in offices in architecture office in Rome and Milan. In 2007, Monotti translated Curzio Malaparte's Donna Come Me into English language titled Woman Like Me.

Foros Yacht House 
Foros Yacht house is a building, built by Monotti Graziadei and his firm, at the southernmost tip of the Crimean coastline. It houses four rental holiday apartments arranged around tall yacht storage at ground level, and connected by a staircase tower. He started working on the Yacht house in 2011 and completed it by 2012.

The Yacht house received a lot of media coverage. It was featured in AJ Buildings Library, Contemporist, and Architects' Journal. ArchDaily wrote that the, "Yacht House is a contemporary response to Russia’s dacha tradition. Robin Monotti’s design is uncompromisingly modern, but also open, playful and people focussed." Architecture Today wrote that "inside, the experience is very much like being in a luxurious yacht, with gleaming white furniture and a rows of porthole windows."

Watering Holes 
In 2010, Monotti Graziadei designed a sculptural stone fountain, called Watering Holes, in collaboration with Mark Titman. They designed the fountain to participate in an International Drinking Fountain competition held by RIBA and Royal Parks Foundation. The competition was intended to find suitable fountains for London's eight Royal Parks. Watering Holes was one of the two winners in the competition. The fountain has three watering holes at heights designed for adults, children & wheelchair users and dogs, cool, fresh drinking water is freely accessible to all park visitors. Watering Holes was listed as one of Time Out's top five drinking fountains in London.

Tbilisi Business Center 
In 2013, Monotti presented the design for Tbilisi Business Center, a 16-floor tower to be constructed next to Bank of Georgia building in  Tbilisi, Georgia. The design of the tower is a stack of glass-enclosed disks that seem to spiral upward. The tower will offer 16,000 sq-meter of space as a new business center and will include offices, conference halls, trading floors, restaurants, outdoor garden terraces on each level. The construction schedule has not yet been determined.

The design has received government's approval. However, as of April 2013, the construction schedule was not determined.

Personal life 
Monotti is married to Vera Filatova. They live in London with their son and daughter. He is the grandson of lawyer Ercole Graziadei and great-grandson of Antonio Graziadei, one of the founding members of the Italian Communist Party.

Awards 
Winner of the RIBA & Royal Parks Foundation International Drinking Fountain Design Competition - 2010
Winner of first place for the Interior of a House in a Modern Style at the Interior of the Year Awards in Ukraine - 2013
Winner of the European Property Awards, 2013 - 2014

References 

Living people
21st-century Italian architects
Year of birth missing (living people)